The Honda Torneo is a mid-size sedan introduced by Honda in 1997, exclusively for the Japanese domestic market, derived from the sixth-generation Honda Accord. While the Accord was sold exclusively at Honda Clio dealerships, the Torneo was available at the other two Honda networks, Honda Verno and Honda Primo as the successor to the Honda Ascot and Honda Rafaga, respectively. "Torneo" means tournament in Spanish.

The introduction of the Torneo continued the original approach Honda used in 1982, with the introduction of the Honda Vigor in offering a unique variant of the Accord, for each of the three dealership Honda sales channels with the sportier Torneo, utilising a different front grille, headlights and tail lights, and exclusive trim packages and color choices.

The Torneo nameplate was discontinued in 2002, when Honda released the seventh-generation Accord. However, the seventh-generation Accord assimilated a number of the sportier characters of the Torneo, making it effectively the successor of the Torneo and the previous generation Accord.

Trim levels and engines
The Torneo was available with HID headlights, which were uncommon at the time. Four engines were available, all equipped with Honda's VTEC technology. A few sport packages were available, including the "Euro R", the "SiR-T", and the "SiR Euro".

It was also fitted with a unique factory body kit that included flares and was available in some colours not available to lower trim package Accords (such as Milano Red). The Accord and the Torneo are the same car, aside from minor cosmetic differences in the exterior. All trim levels were available with Honda's internet-based navigation system called Internavi.

SiR-T (CF4, 1997–2000)
The H Series DOHC VTEC engines were limited to 7,800 rpm. 

The F20B had a unique blue valve cover and like all the larger displacement Honda engines, the F20B was mounted with a tilt towards the driver. F20B engines could rev at higher rpm than H22As because it had a shorter stroke. The F20B had an 85 mm x 88 mm bore and stroke when compared to an H22A which had an 87 mm x 90.7 mm bore and stroke. The F20B was also classified as a low-emissions engine.

SiR (CF4, 1997–2001)
The Torneo SiR was based on the SiR-T, but used the S-Matic automatic transmission with sequential manual shift mode. Moving the gear stick over to the right allowed manual selection of first, second, third, or fourth gear using up and down shift actions. 

The manumatic feature would hold the gear up to the rev limiter as a manual transmission would.

SiR Euro (CF4, 2002)
The Torneo SiR Euro was offered in its very last year of production, 2002. Underneath, it was the same as the original SiR and available only with an automatic transmission, but it was presented with the same exterior styling as the Euro R. Front and rear bumpers, side skirts and arch extensions directly from the Euro R were offered onto the SiR Euro, as well as the "carbon" interior trim. The seats and steering wheel were still original SiR equipment. The SiR Euro also retained the 4-stud wheel hub and had only 1 set of 15-inch wheels available.

Demise
As sales of the Accord proved more popular than the Torneo, plus the economic effects of the Japanese asset price bubble or "bubble economy", the Torneo was discontinued in 2001, along with the dissolution of Honda's three dealership networks Verno, Primo, and Clio three years later. The succeeding Accord also effectively assimilated the sportier character of the Torneo into one car.

Gallery

External links

 Honda Torneo History (Japanese)
 Honda Torneo Product Description (Japanese)
 Honda Japan TV commercial for the Torneo

Torneo
Compact cars
Front-wheel-drive vehicles
1990s cars
2000s cars